Pecq is a municipality of Wallonia located in the province of Hainaut, Belgium. 

The municipality consists of the following districts: Esquelmes, Hérinnes, Obigies, Pecq, and Warcoing.

References

External links
 

Municipalities of Hainaut (province)